is a railway station on the Chikuho Main Line operated by JR Kyushu in Nakama, Fukuoka Prefecture, Japan.

Lines

Station layout 
The station consists of an island platform serving two tracks. A station building, of traditional design houses a waiting room and automatic ticket vending machines. Access to the island platform is by means of a covered footbridge. A bike shed is provided outside the station.

Adjacent stations

History 
Japanese Government Railways (JGR) opened the station on 26 April 1935 as an additional station on the existing Chikuho Main Line track. With the privatization of Japanese National Railways (JNR), the successor of JGR, on 1 April 1987, control of the station passed to JR Kyushu.

On 4 March 2017, Chikuzen-Habu, along with several other stations on the line, became a "Smart Support Station".

Passenger statistics
In fiscal 2016, the station was used by an average of 396 passengers daily (boarding passengers only), and it ranked 271st among the busiest stations of JR Kyushu.

References

External links
Chikuzen-Habu (JR Kyushu)

Railway stations in Fukuoka Prefecture
Railway stations in Japan opened in 1935